Urokodia aequalis is an extinct genus of arthropod from the early Cambrian. The taxon is only known from the  Maotianshan Shales of China based on some 15 specimens. Its segmentation resembles that of a millipede and it possessed head and tail shields with thorny spikes. It has some similarities to the arthropod Mollisonia that is known from both the Burgess Shale of Canada and the Kaili biota of China. Recently, the taxon has been considered a member of the order Mollisoniida, alongside Mollisonia, Thelxiope, and Corcorania, the group are suggested to be stem-chelicerates.

References 

Urokodia aequalis Arthropod from Maotianshan Shales - URL retrieved September 11, 2010

Prehistoric crustaceans
Cambrian arthropods
Maotianshan shales fossils

Cambrian genus extinctions